Mahasti Shahrokhi is an Iranian novelist, poet, and winner of numerous literary prizes. Her novel, A Shawl as Long as the Silk Road (Baran Publication, Sweden, 1999) attracted critical attention, and Cactus magazine (published in the U.S.) devoted its third publication to this novel. Her recent writings have been published in Another Sea, Another Shore: Persian Stories of Migration (Interlink World Fiction, United States), and The Other Voices International Poetry . Her novel Sobh-e Nahan and poetry collection Jomhoori-e Sokoot are due for publication.

Mahasti earned her Ph.D. in literature at the Sorbonne, France. She lives in Paris.

Books
 The Other Voices International poetry Anthology 
 Another Sea, Another Shore (Interlink World Fiction), 2004 (Contributing author) 
 Shaban Nikou (Baran Publishing) (Persian) 
 A Shawl as Long as the Silk Road (Shali Be Deraza-ye Jadeh-ye Abrisham, Baran Publishing)
 Jomhuri-ye Sokout: Republique du Silence (Persian Edition), 2013 
 Ma patrie ? Mes chaussures !: Adaptation Française Du Persan Par Valérie Alis-Salamanca (French Edition), 2015 
 shali be deraza-ye jadeh abrisham: Un Châle aussi long que la route de soie, Persian Edition 
 Degardissi-ye cinema-ye iran beh cinema-ye Halal: Majmo'eh-ye Maghaleh, Persian Edition 
 Sobh-e nahan: L'aube latente (Persian Edition)

External links
 Her Weblog, Chashman-e Bidar 
 DW (Persian)
 Author's books
 Open Edition Journals

References

Iranian women novelists
Iranian novelists
Iranian women poets
University of Paris alumni
Iranian women writers
Iranian writers
Iranian emigrants to France
Living people
Iranian women short story writers
1956 births